The Payson Historic District is a  historic district in Payson, Utah that was listed on the National Register of Historic Places in 2007.

Description
The district includes 429 contributing buildings, two contributing structures, one contributing site and five contributing objects. It includes work dating to 1857, and Mid 19th Century Revival architecture, and Late Victorian architecture. It includes two historic hotels.

The district includes four contributing buildings that were already separately listed on the National Register:
 Christopher F. Dixon Jr. House, 248 North Main Street
 John Dixon House, 218 North Main Street
 Payson Presbyterian Church, 160 South Main Street
 Samuel Douglass House, 215 North Main Street
The Peteetneet School, also NRHP-listed, is just adjacent to the east edge of the district.

See also

 National Register of Historic Places listings in Utah County, Utah

References

External links

Georgian architecture in Utah
Victorian architecture in Utah
Historic districts in Utah County, Utah
Historic districts on the National Register of Historic Places in Utah
National Register of Historic Places in Utah County, Utah
Buildings and structures in Payson, Utah
1857 establishments in Utah Territory